Pucaranra (possibly from Quechua puka red, ranra stony; stony ground,) is a mountain in the Cordillera Blanca in the Andes of Peru, about  high (although other sources cite an elevation of . It is located in Ancash, southwest of mount Chinchey. Its territory is within the Peruvian protection area of Huascarán National Park, at the border of two provinces: Carhuaz and Huaraz (Districts of San Miguel De Aco and Independencia).

First Ascent 
Pucaranra was first climbed by B. Lauterburg, Federico Marmillod, R. Schmid and F. Sigrist (Switzerland) April 07th 1948 via Southwest spur of the south ridge.

Elevation 
Other data from available digital elevation models: SRTM 6138 metres and TanDEM-X 5961 metres. The height of the nearest key col is 3253 meters, leading to a topographic prominence of 2903 meters. Pucaranra is considered a Mountain Sub-System according to the Dominance System  and its dominance is 47.16%. Its parent peak is Chinchey and the Topographic isolation is 2.4 kilometers.

Climbing
Several interesting lines on this mountain, none of them very serious but all requiring commitment. The east-northeast ridge is rated AD/D (depending on conditions), the southeast face AD+ and the southeast ridge AD.

External links 

 Elevation information about Pucaranra
 Weather Forecast at Pucaranra

References

Mountains of Peru
Mountains of Ancash Region
Six-thousanders of the Andes